Miconia cercophora is a species of plant in the family Melastomataceae, endemic to Ecuador.  Its natural habitat is subtropical or tropical moist lowland forests and subtropical or tropical moist montane forests.

References

cercophora
Endemic flora of Ecuador
Near threatened plants
Taxonomy articles created by Polbot